Ritual is an album by Argentine pianist, vocalist and composer Fernando Otero, recorded in 2015 and released on the Siderata Records label. Ritual brings a collection of new compositions for Orchestra, Voices and Chamber Ensembles. The composer appeared to be working more towards the production of formal classical works which display a significant grounding in the Argentine lyricism–usually associated with Tango–plus elements of classical music and piano improvisation. This work features vocal and violin lines, and full orchestra textures. The album emphasizes melodic and slow tempos, and the bandoneon is present in two of the pieces, driving the listener into an Argentine atmosphere, both timbrical and melodic.

Reception
Otero received two Latin Grammy nominations for Ritual, as "Best Classical Album"
and "Best Contemporary Classical Composition", for his composition entitled Conexion.

Track listing
All compositions by Fernando Otero
    Overture
    Ceremonia             
    Siderata
    Fortuna
    Conexion    
    Cielo Del Suburbio
    Primeras Luces 
    Memoire

Personnel
aMBe (Maria Brodskaya)  - vocals
 Nick Danielson - violin
Adam Fisher - violincello
Patricio Villarejo - violincello
 Brian Forbes - classical guitar
Ivan Barenboim - soprano, bass,  contra-alto clarinet
 Pablo Aslan - double bass
Bandoneon: Hector Del Curto - bandoneon
Fernando Otero - Composer
The New York State Symphony Orchestra
Brian Forbes - mixing, engineer (at The Gallery Recording Studio)
Max Ross - engineer (at Systems Two Studio)
Manuel Valdivia - engineer (at La Casa Post)
Jim Brick - mastering (at Absolute Audio)
Gonzalo Pujal Laplagne - cover design
Luciano Antinori - cover artwork (from the “Humus Cantropus” series)

References

2015 albums
Classical albums by Argentine artists
Argentine music